Digital Bros is an Italian video game company that develops, publishes and distributes games. It publishes games under its 505 Games subsidiary brand since 2007 and established video game development school, Digital Bros Game Academy, in 2014. Digital Bros was founded in 1989 as Halifax and the name is still used for distribution.

Digital Bros is headquartered in Milan with offices in the United Kingdom, United States, France, Spain, Germany, China, Hong Kong and Japan.

History

1989–2000: Founding and growth
Halifax S.p.A. was founded in 1989 in Milan, Italy, by the brothers Abramo and Raffaele Galante. In the 1990s, the company had the rights to distribute games of international publishers on the Italian market through its Halifax brand; including Pro Evolution Soccer, Tomb Raider and Resident Evil. It was listed on the STAR segment of the Italian Stock Exchange in 2000.

Digital Bros also operated the European television channel Game Network from 1999 to 2006 and operated European servers for The Legend of Mir series and various other online games under the Game Network brand until 2009.

2001–2014: Internationalization and digitalization
In 2006, Digital Bros founded subsidiary 505 Games (505 GameStreet). In 2012, it started publishing games on digital platforms, Steam, PlayStation Network and Xbox Live. In 2013, it established its mobile games division, 505 Games Mobile.

2015–2020: Acquisitions and investments
In 2015, Digital Bros acquired DR Studios, a developer based in Milton Keynes, United Kingdom and was made responsible of its Free to Play games. The company acquired a stake of 49% in Ovosonico, a developer based in Varese. In 2017, the group acquired Kunos Simulazioni, a developer specializing in driving simulations, headquartered in Rome, Italy.

In 2020, it announced its intent to generate 50% of its revenue from its own games. On 3 March 2020, Digital Bros acquires 51% of the remaining shares of the Ovosonico studio from Massimo Guarini.
The Ovosonico brand remains the property of Massimo Guarini, controlled by Guarini Design, while the development studio, with its employees, has been acquired by Digital Bros.

Subsidiaries 
 505 Games
 DR Studios
 Kunos Simulazioni
 Avantgarden
 Nesting Games
 Supernova Games
 Infinity Plus Two
 Ingame Studios

See also
 List of 505 video games

References

External links
 

Italian brands
Companies based in Milan
Video game companies established in 1989
Italian companies established in 1989
Video game companies of Italy
Video game publishers
505 Games